Richard A. Oppel Jr. is an American journalist who has reported for The New York Times from Iraq, Israel and Washington, D.C. He is a graduate of Duke University.

In the 90's, Oppel reported for the Los Angeles Times, the Fort Worth Star-Telegram and the Dallas Morning News.

Personal
Oppel is the son of Rich Oppel, former editor of the Austin American-Statesman, and Carol V. Oppel, a freelance writer specializing in religious topics.

Oppel's sister, Shelby Oppel Wood, is an education reporter at The Oregonian newspaper.

Notes

Year of birth missing (living people)
Living people
American male journalists
Duke University alumni
Los Angeles Times people
Fort Worth Star-Telegram people
The New York Times writers
American war correspondents